Elisabeth Cruciger (also spelled Kreuziger, Creutziger etc.; née von Meseritz) (c. 1500 - 2 May 1535), a German writer, was the first female poet and hymnwriter of the Protestant Reformation and a friend of Martin Luther.

Life 
 

Elisabeth von Meseritz was born into a noble family in Eastern Pomerania. While still a child, she became a nun at the Marienbusch Abbey, a Premonstratensian cloister in Treptow an der Rega. At the cloisters, she learnt of the religious ideas of the Reformation through Johannes Bugenhagen, one of the influential figures in Lutheranism.

In 1522 Elisabeth left the abbey to move to Wittenberg, where she joined Bugenhagen's household. Then in 1524 she married the theologian Caspar Cruciger, a student and an assistant to Martin Luther. Together they had two children: a daughter, Elisabeth, who married Andreas Kegel, the rector of Luther's hometown Eisleben, and then—on Kegel's death—Luther's son Johannes; and a son, Caspar Cruciger the Younger, who succeeded in Philip Melanchthon's post as professorship at Wittenburg.

Elisabeth Cruciger died in Wittenberg in 1535.

Veneration
In 2022, Elisabeth Cruciger was officially added to the Episcopal Church liturgical calendar with a feast day on 3 May.

Works 

 For Epiphany - "" in the current German Protestant hymnal  (EG) Nr. 67 (originally known as Eyn Lobsanck vom Christo, first published in Erfurt 1524 in Eyn Enchiridion oder Handbüchlein, an early Protestant hymnal)

Notes

References

Further references 
 
  Carl Bertheau: Kreutziger, Elisabeth. In: Allgemeine Deutsche Biographie (ADB). Vol 17, Duncker & Humblot, Leipzig 1883, p. 148 f.
  Sonja Domröse: Frauen der Reformationszeit, Gelehrt, mutig und glaubensfest, Vandenhoeck & Ruprecht, Göttingen 2010, 
  Walther Killy: Killy Literaturlexikon. Autoren und Werke deutscher Sprache. Directmedia Publications, Berlin 2000, . (1 CD-ROM)
  Elisabeth Schneider-Böklen: Elisabeth Cruciger, die erste Dichterin des Protestantismus. In: Gottesdienst und Kirchenmusik''. Heft 2/1994, S. 32 ff.
  Wolfgang Herbst: Wer ist wer im Gesangbuch? (Onlineleseprobe)

External links 

1500 births
1535 deaths
16th-century German Roman Catholic nuns
Premonstratensian nuns
German women poets
German Lutheran hymnwriters
Converts to Lutheranism from Roman Catholicism
16th-century hymnwriters
Women hymnwriters
16th-century women composers
Cruciger family
Martin Luther family
Anglican saints

Year of birth uncertain
People of the Protestant Reformation